Hastings station or Hastings railway station may refer to:

 Hastings railway station, UK
 Hastings railway station, Melbourne, Hastings, Victoria, Australia 
 Hastings railway station, New Zealand 
 Hastings station (MBTA), Hastings, Massachusetts, United States
 Hastings station (Nebraska), Hastings, Nebraska, United States
 Hastings-on-Hudson station, Hastings-on-Hudson, New York, United States
 Hastings Bulverhythe, or Bulverhythe railway station, Hastings, England

See also
Hastings (disambiguation)